Carlos Salamanca was the defending champion but lost to Agustín Velotti in the second round.

Alejandro Falla won his second title of this tournament. He defeated Eduardo Schwank 6–4, 6–3 in the final.

Seeds

Draw

Finals

Top half

Bottom half

References
 Main Draw
 Qualifying Draw

Seguros Bolivar Open Cali - Singles
2011 Singles